The 5th Adelaide Film Festival took place in Adelaide, Australia, from 24 February to 6 March 2011. Katrina Sedgwick was again Festival Director. Julietta Sichel was the head of the jury for the main competition. Judy Davis received the 2011 Don Dunstan Award for her contribution to the Australian film industry on the opening night of the Festival. The glass statuette was presented by Australian filmmaker Fred Schepisi.

A special screening of the 2010 Restoration Version of Fritz Lang's classic sci-fi epic Metropolis was shown with a new score, written by The New Pollutants. This original score was conceived, composed and recorded over a 12-month period, and had its world premiere at the 2005 Adelaide Film Festival.

The festival opened with Mrs Carey's Concert, directed by Bob Connolly and Sophie Raymond, and closed with Mad Bastards, directed by Brendan Fletcher. The film poster for the festival featured a man projecting a film from within himself, illustrating the theme "See Within."

The Canadian film Incendies won the International Award for Best Feature Film.

Competition

Jury
The following people were selected for the In Competition Jury:
 Julietta Sichel,  Czech film critic (President)
 Trevor Groth, American Artistic Director, Sundance Film Festival
 Pierre Rissient, French film director
 Hossein Valamanesh, Australian artist
 Robin Gutch, British producer, Warp Films

In Competition
The following films were selected for the In Competition section:

Special Screenings

Awards
The International Award for Best Feature Film
The International Award for Best Feature Film was won by the Canadian film Incendies directed by Denis Villeneuve.

Audience Award
The Audience Award for Best Feature Film was won by Snowtown.

The Audience Award for Best Documentary was won by Senna.

The Audience Award for Best Short Film was won by The Palace.

Don Dunstan Award
The Don Dunstan Award was won by Judy Davis.

References

External links
 Official Website
 Includes complete program.

Adelaide Film Festival
Adelaide Film Festival
2010s in Adelaide
Adelaide Film Festival